The siege of Warsaw in 1939 was fought between the Polish Warsaw Army garrisoned and entrenched in Warsaw and the invading German Army.

It began with huge aerial bombardments initiated by the Luftwaffe starting on September 1, 1939 following the Nazi invasion of Poland. Land fighting started on September 8, when the first German armored units reached the Wola district and south-western suburbs of the city. Despite German radio broadcasts claiming to have captured Warsaw, the initial enemy attack was repelled and soon afterwards Warsaw was placed under siege. The siege lasted until September 28, when the Polish garrison, commanded under General Walerian Czuma, officially capitulated. The following day approximately 140,000 Polish troops left the city and were taken as prisoners of war. On October 1 the Wehrmacht entered Warsaw, which started a period of German occupation that lasted until the devastating Warsaw Uprising and later until January 17, 1945, when the Wehrmacht troops abandoned the city due to the advance of Soviet forces.

Around 18,000 civilians of Warsaw perished during the siege. As a result of the air bombardments, 10% of the city's buildings were entirely destroyed and further 40% were heavily damaged.

Under the international rules regarding aerial warfare in 1939 Warsaw was considered a legitimate military target as the city was on the front line during the fighting and it was heavily defended by the Polish army.

History

Heavy bombardments 

From the very first hours of World War II, Warsaw, the capital of Poland, was a target of an unrestricted aerial bombardment campaign initiated by the German Luftwaffe, which was controlled by Hermann Göring. Apart from the military facilities such as infantry barracks and the Okęcie airport and aircraft factory, the German pilots also targeted civilian facilities such as water works, hospitals, market places and schools, which resulted in heavy human casualties that possibly led to the early surrender by lowering of morale of the Polish army defending the city.

The anti-aircraft defence of the capital was divided into active and passive parts. The former was composed mostly of units of the Pursuit Brigade (Brygada Pościgowa) under Colonel Stefan Pawlikowski, and anti-aircraft artillery and anti-aircraft machine guns detachments under Colonel Kazimierz Baran. The Pursuit Brigade was equipped with 54 fighter aircraft, mostly the obsolete PZL P.7 and PZL P.11 types. The AA artillery had 86 pieces of anti-aircraft artillery, as well as an unknown number of other anti-aircraft machine guns. The latter was composed mostly of fire-fighter brigades and volunteers and was supervised by Colonel Tadeusz Bogdanowicz and Julian Kulski, the deputy president

Initially the air defence of Warsaw was fairly successful and by September 6, 1939, the Pursuit Brigade had shot down 43 enemy aircraft, while anti-aircraft artillery had shot down a similar number of enemy bombers. There were also 9 unconfirmed victories and 20 damaged enemy planes. However, the brigade also suffered heavy losses, and by September 7 it had lost over 38 pieces of equipment, or approximately 70% of its initial strength, which greatly contributed to an early surrender.

The AA defence started to crumble when on September 5 by order of the military authorities 11 AA batteries were withdrawn from Warsaw towards the eastern cities of Lublin, Brześć and Lwów. Furthermore, as the war progressed, the German high command redirected more bombers to attack the city, especially the historical old town, the Warsaw Royal Castle and other iconic monuments, significant to the Polish nation and its capital. At the peak of the initial bombing campaign on September 10, there were more than 70 German bombers above Warsaw. During that day, nicknamed "Bloody Sunday", there were 17 consecutive bombing raids.

Eve of the battle 
On September 3, the forces of German 4th Panzer Division under Major General Georg-Hans Reinhardt managed to break through positions of the Polish Łódź Army near Częstochowa and started their march towards the river Vistula and Warsaw. The same day Polish Commander in Chief, Marshal of Poland Edward Rydz-Śmigły ordered the creation of an improvised Command of the Defence of Warsaw (Dowództwo Obrony Warszawy). General Walerian Czuma, the head of the Border Guard (Straż Graniczna), became its commander and Colonel Tadeusz Tomaszewski its Chief of Staff.

Initially the forces under the command of General Czuma were very limited. Most of the city authorities withdrew together with a large part of the police forces, fire fighters and the military garrison. Warsaw was left with only four battalions of infantry and one battery of artillery. Also, the spokesman of the garrison of Warsaw issued a communique in which he ordered all young men to leave Warsaw. To coordinate civilian efforts and counter the panic that started in Warsaw, Czuma appointed the president of Warsaw Stefan Starzyński as the Civilian Commissar of Warsaw. Starzyński started to organize the Civil Guard to replace the evacuated police forces and the fire fighters. He also ordered all members of the city's administration to return to their posts. In his daily radio releases he asked all civilians to construct barricades and anti-tank barriers on the streets and at the outskirts of Warsaw. On September 7 the 40th Infantry Regiment "Children of Lwów" (commanded by Lt.Col. Józef Kalandyk) – transiting through Warsaw towards previously assigned positions with the Army Pomorze – was stopped and joined the defense of Warsaw.

Initial clashes 

The field fortifications were constructed mostly to the west of the city limits. Gradually, the forces of General Walerian Czuma were reinforced with volunteers composed of mostly civilians, including women and children, as well as rearguard troops and units withdrawing from the front. On the morning of September 8, the suburbs of Grójec, Radziejowice, Nadarzyn, Raszyn and Piaseczno were captured by forces of German XVI Panzer Corps. At exactly 5pm the forces of the German 4th Panzer Division attempted an assault on Warsaw's western borough of Ochota. The assault was repulsed and the German forces suffered heavy casualties with many Panzer I and Panzer II tanks lost. The following day, the 4th Panzer Division was reinforced with artillery and motorised infantry, and began another assault towards Ochota and Wola. The well-placed Polish 75 mm anti-tank guns firing at point-blank range, and the barricades erected on main streets, successfully managed to repel all initiated assaults and unexpected attacks.

One of the barricades erected at the crossing of Opaczewska and Grójecka streets was defended by the 4th company of the 40th "Children of Lwów" Regiment. After the war a monument was built on the spot to commemorate the battle. On several occasions lack of armament had to be made up for by ingenuity. One of the streets leading towards the city center was covered with turpentine from a nearby factory. When the German tanks approached, the liquid was ignited and the tanks were destroyed without a single shot fired.

The German forces suffered heavy casualties and had to retreat westward to help thwart the Bzura River counter-offensive. The 4th Panzer Division alone lost approximately 80 tanks out of the approximately 220 that took part in the assault.

Second phase 

By then General Czuma had gathered an equivalent of 2 infantry divisions under his command. His forces were supported by 64 pieces of artillery and 33 tanks (27 of Vickers E, 7-TP and R-35 and 6 TK-3 and TKS tankettes). On September 8 the Commander-in-Chief, Marshal Edward Rydz-Śmigły ordered the creation of an improvised Warsaw Army (Armia Warszawa) under General Juliusz Rómmel. The newly created force was composed of the forces defending Warsaw and Modlin Fortress, as well as all Polish units defending the Narew and the Vistula between Warsaw and Pilica river lines. General Czuma continued to be the commander of the Warsaw Defence Force, which he split into two sectors: East (Praga district) under Lt.Col. Julian Janowski and West under Colonel Marian Porwit.

The Army Poznań commanded by General Tadeusz Kutrzeba, and Army Pomorze under General Władysław Bortnowski started an offensive on the left flank of the German forces advancing towards Warsaw. As a result of this offensive that later became known as the Battle of Bzura, German commanders withdrew the 4th Panzer Division and sent it to counter the Polish threat near Kutno. Its positions were replaced by forces of a weakened German 31st Infantry Division. In this sense the desperate attempt to buy time for organising a defence of Warsaw was a success. The defenders of the city were joined by various units of the routed Prusy Army. In addition, several new units were created in Warsaw out of reserve centres of Warsaw-based 8th Polish Infantry Division and 36th "Academic Legion" Infantry Regiment.

On September 11 the Polish Commander in Chief ordered that Warsaw was to be defended at all costs, despite the possible heavy casualties and civilian losses. The following day the forces of German 3rd Army (under General Georg von Küchler) broke through Polish lines along the Narew river and started its march southwards to cut off Warsaw from the east. It was assaulted by cavalry units under Władysław Anders, but after heavy fighting the Polish counter-offensive failed and the forces were withdrawn to the south. Other Polish units fighting under General Juliusz Zulauf near the Narew River area retreated and reached Warsaw on September 14. They were incorporated as the core of the defence forces of the borough of Praga district.

On September 15 the German forces reached Warsaw from the east and the capital of Poland was under siege. Only a strip of land along the Vistula leading towards the Kampinos Forest and Modlin Fortress was still controlled by Polish forces. The defence of the Modlin fortress was an important relief to the defenders of Warsaw.

Siege of Warsaw 

On 15 September, the German Third Army from Army Group North attacked Praga.  They attacked from both sides of the Vistula.

After heavy fighting for the Grochów area the German 23rd Infantry Regiment was annihilated by the Polish defenders of the 21st "Children of Warsaw" Infantry Regiment under colonel (later promoted to general) Stanisław Sosabowski.

After the Battle of Bzura ended, the remnants of the Poznań Army and the Pomorze Army broke through the German encirclement and arrived in Warsaw and Modlin between 18–21 September from the Kampinos Forest. After that the forces of the defenders amounted to approximately 140,000 soldiers. The German forces preparing for an all-out assault numbered 13 divisions with one thousand artillery pieces. On September 22 the last lines of communication between Warsaw and Modlin were cut by German forces reaching the Vistula.

As preparation for the storming, the city was shelled day and night with artillery and aerial bombardment. Among the guns used were heavy railway guns and mortars. Two entire air fleets took part in the air raids against both civilian and military targets. After September 20 the forces on the eastern bank of the Vistula started daily attacks on the Praga suburb. All were successfully counter-attacked by the Polish forces. On September 24 all German units concentrated around Warsaw were put under command of general Johannes Blaskowitz

An initial German attack took place on 23 September, which was successfully repulsed. On September 25 the next attack started with an artillery and air bombardment, including 1,200 aircraft. This so-called "Black Monday" became a legend in the history of Warsaw.

The following day in the early morning the general assault was started on all fronts of surrounded Warsaw. Western parts of the city were attacked by 5 German divisions (10th, 18th, 19th, 31st and 46th) while the eastern part was attacked by 4 divisions (11th, 32nd, 61st and 217th). The attack was supported by approximately 70 batteries of field artillery, 80 batteries of heavy artillery and two entire air fleets (1st and 4th), which bombarded the city continuously causing heavy losses in the civilian population. On 26 September, the Forts of Mokotów, Dąbrowski and Czerniaków fell to the German assault.

Capitulation and surrender 

General Czuma managed to gather enough forces and war material to successfully defend the city for several weeks longer. However, the situation of the civilian inhabitants of Warsaw became increasingly tragic. Constant bombardment of civilian facilities, lack of food and medical supplies resulted in heavy casualties among the city's population.

The water works were destroyed by German bombers and all boroughs of Warsaw experienced a lack of both potable water and water with which to extinguish the fires caused by the constant bombardment. Also, the strategic situation became very difficult. The Soviet Union's entry into the war and lack of support from the Western Allies made the defence of the city pointless and heavily demotivated the volunteers in participating in any further military actions.

On September 26, Army Warsaw General Juliusz Rómmel, started capitulation talks with the German commander. On September 27, at 12:00 a cease fire agreement was signed and all fighting halted. Soon afterwards, Warsaw capitulated. Several units declined to put down their weapons and cease fire, and their commanding officers had to be visited by generals Czuma and Rómmel personally.

On September 29, the garrison of Warsaw started to hide or destroy their heavy armament. Some of the hidden war material was later used during the Warsaw Uprising. On September 30, the evacuation of Polish forces to German prisoner of war camps started and, the following day, German units entered the capital. City was occupied until January 17, 1945.

Opposing forces

Gallery

See also 
 Bombing of Warsaw in World War II
 Festung Warschau
 History of Warsaw
 Warsaw Uprising
List of World War II military equipment of Poland
List of German military equipment of World War II

References

Further reading 
 Bryan, Julien – Siege. New York: Doubleday, Doran, 1940
 Norbert Konwinski (1978) – The Mayor: Saga of Stefan Starzynski. Claremont: Diversified Enterprises. .
  Bartoszewski, Władysław  – 1859 Dnii Warszawy (1859 Days of Warsaw) – Wydawnictwo Znak, Cracow 1974

External links 

 Abstracts of official documents for World War II – Chap 6–8, pp 78–121
 Siege  a contemporary documentary by Julien Bryan

Warsaw
Military history of Warsaw
Warsaw (1939)
Warsaw (1939)
Warsaw Voivodeship (1919–1939)
Massacres in Poland
Mass murder in 1939
20th century in Warsaw
Warsaw 1939
September 1939 events
Massacres in 1939